Ambedkar Students' Association (ASA) is a student organization in India representing students from Scheduled Castes and Scheduled Tribes (SC/ST), Other Backward Class (OBC), religious minorities and other oppressed communities. ASA works for the assertion of students from dalit and other marginalised communities.

History
ASA was founded in 1993 by a group of Dalit students at Hyderabad Central University, led by PhD scholar Rajasekhar.

Role
ASA is active in University of Hyderabad, University of Mumbai, Pondicherry University, Tata Institute of Social Sciences, Central University of Gujarat, Central University of Kerala and Panjab University. ASA conducts regular seminars and events on Ambedkarism and protests. It also works for scholarships and fee issues of SC/ST/Blind students. ASA actively works for implementation of reservation policy on campus and against incidents of caste discrimination on campus.

See also
Birsa Ambedkar Phule Students' Association

References

External links

Student organisations in India
Student organizations established in 1993
1993 establishments in Andhra Pradesh
Ambedkarite organisations
Dalit politics